That Splendid November (Italian: Un bellissimo novembre) is a 1969 Italian  film directed by Mauro Bolognini. It stars actors Gabriele Ferzetti and Gina Lollobrigida. It is based on a novel with the same name written by Ercole Patti.

Plot
A few days after All Saints' Day a widespread Sicilian clan meets in their country castle near Catania. The younger generation has long recognized that there is a lot of hypocrisy hidden behind the elegant setting and the strict morals. That is why the seventeen-year-old Nino feels particularly drawn to his beautiful aunt Cettina, who is considered the black sheep of the family because she ran off into a marriage that was not entirely approved. The experienced woman, however, smugly kindles the fire of a glowing passion in the awakened young man, seduces him according to all the rules of the art - and then appears very astonished when Nino, full of mad jealousy, does not want to share his place with older lover Sasà. The hope that he had fleetingly hoped that Cettina would be completely committed to himself, contrary to all conventions, vanished.
Nino, resigned, throws himself into a marriage with a young cousin - and will play the usual game without open rebellion. At the church door he exchanges a soft "See you soon!" with his attractive aunt.

Cast
 Gina Lollobrigida: Cettina
 André Laurence: Sasà
 Gabriele Ferzetti: Biagio
 Paolo Turco: Nino
 Danielle Godet: Elisa
 Margarita Lozano: Amalia
 Isabella Savona: Giulietta
 Jean Maucorps: Mimì
 Corrado Gaipa: Alfio

References

External links

1969 films
Italian drama films
1960s Italian-language films
Films set in Sicily
Films scored by Ennio Morricone
United Artists films
1960s Italian films